The Sea to Sea Trail (Shvil MiYam LeYam) is a hiking path that crosses the north of Israel.  Its western end is in the Mediterranean Sea at Achziv, near the Lebanese border in the far north of the country, and it extends to the Sea of Gallilee, a length of approximately 71 km (44 mi). The trail is marked with different colors in different sections, and takes an average of 3–4 days to complete.

The trail was very popular among youth organizations in the 1950s and 60s.

The Hebrew Scouts Movement in Israel has been organizing the Sea to Sea hike every year during the Passover holidays, for 14 years old Scouts since 1919.

The first part of the trail climbs from the Sea of Gallilee through Nahal Amud to the grave of Rabbi Shimon bar Yochai grave on Mount Meron. This section of the trail is part of the Israel National Trail. The second section of the trail goes from Mount Meron through Nahal Kziv to Ma'alot-Tarshiha. The third day of the hike follows Nahal Kziv to the sea.

See also
Tourism in Israel
Geography of Israel
List of long-distance footpaths
Wildlife in Israel

References

External links
 Sea to Sea trail on Wikivoyage
 The trail in Google maps
 Trail blog

Geography of Israel
Tourism in Israel
Hiking trails in Israel
Sea of Galilee